Beremundo González Rodríguez (Petín, 1909-Paris, 1986) was a Galician writer and communist politician.

He spent some time in Cuba in the 1930s and when he came back to Spain, he became a member of the Communist Party of Spain. After the Spanish Civil War, he moved to France and collaborated with  Fidel Castro's Cuban Revolution and spent some years in Argentina before coming back to France.

Works
Poética Galicia. Paris, 1971 (1973, 2ª ed.).
La poesía revolucionaria española. Paris, 1976.
Háblame de Amor, 1969.
Águila intercontinental, 1970.
Cité de la Nuit, 1970
Poèmes pour le Vietnam, 1972 (with Franco Bianciardi).

Bibliography
Repertorio Bibliográfico do Exilio Galego, 2001: Ficha nº 1703.
García Yáñez, Félix, O Barco e a Terra de Valdeorras durante a II República e o Franquismo: 1931 - 1977. Vigo. Edicións A Nosa Terra. 2005.

1909 births
1986 deaths
Spanish male writers
Communist Party of Spain politicians